The 2011 Derby City Council election took place on 5 May 2011 to elect members of Derby City Council in England. The council remained under No Overall Control.

Election results

All comparisons in vote share are to the corresponding 2007 election.

Ward results

Abbey

Allestree

Alvaston

Arboretum

Blagreaves

Boulton

Chaddesden

Chellaston

Darley

Derwent

Littleover

Mackworth

Mickleover

Normanton

Oakwood

Sinfin

Spondon

References

2011 English local elections
2012
2010s in Derby